The New Synagogue is a synagogue in the old town of Dresden, Germany. The edifice was completed in 2001 and designed by architects Rena Wandel-Hoefer and Wolfgang Lorch. It was built on the same location as the Semper Synagogue (1839–1840) designed by Gottfried Semper, which was destroyed in 1938, during the Kristallnacht.

The boundary wall of the New Synagogue incorporates more or less the last remaining fragments of Semper's original building. The outer walls of the synagogue are built slightly off plumb, intended by the architect to convey the feeling that the Jewish community has always been slightly set off from the German city.  Another reason is that the praying direction faces Jerusalem. The synagogue is also a contrast to the city center with which it is juxtaposed.  It is set on a slight rise just at the edge of Dresden's baroque center, which was completely flattened by allied bombing during the war.  The center is being rebuilt with buildings whose exteriors (and in the case of the more significant buildings, also interiors, though not construction materials,) are precise replicas of the baroque royal city that long made Dresden famous.  The synagogue and the community center stand on both sides of where the Semper Synagogue once stood, but it is not a replica of the historic Semper Synagogue.  It is a modernist statement that contrasts with its neighbors.

Inside, the sanctuary building is a cube (all service functions are located in the companion building set at the other end of a stone plaza.) Within this cube is set a square worship space, curtained off on all four sides by an enormous draping of curtains made of chain-mesh in a golden metal, evoking an echo of the scale of the Temple at Jerusalem.

The building was shortlisted by the jury for the European Union Prize for Contemporary Architecture in 2003.

On New Year's Eve (Silvester in German) in 2012, the mail box was broken at the entrance to the synagogue in Dresden and a blasphemous inscription was spray-painted on the external wall, which was interpreted as an anti-Semitic act.

Rabbis
The Synagogue has had 3 Rabbis until today (October 2022): Rabbi Almekias Siegl (1998-2011) that was serving all 3 Saxonian cities, Rabbi Alexander Nechama (2012-2018) and Rabbi Akiva Weingarten (2019-2021).

Gallery

Notes

External links
 Information about Dresden Synagogue

Synagogues completed in 2001
Dresden, New Synagogue
Synagogues in Saxony
Buildings and structures in Dresden
Tourist attractions in Dresden
Religion in Dresden